Adventures in Utopia is the fourth studio album by Utopia.

Mixing their earlier progressive rock style with mainstream rock, pop and disco music, Adventures in Utopia achieved success both with the band's established fan base and wider commercial success, with the track "Set Me Free" released as a single. The song became the only Top 40 single for Utopia in the United States. "Umbrella Man" was its B-side.

The by-then established Utopia line-up of Todd Rundgren, Kasim Sulton, Roger Powell and John "Willie" Wilcox wrote, performed and produced the album on their own.

According to Rundgren, the album was intended to be the soundtrack for a TV show the band was working on. Even though the album was recorded in a place with video equipment, they never got around to writing or producing the TV pilot

Track listing
All tracks are written by Utopia (Rundgren, Powell, Wilcox, Sulton).

Personnel
Todd Rundgren - Electric guitar, lead vocals (1, 3, 6–8, 10), backing vocals
Roger Powell - keyboards, lead vocals (5), backing vocals, trumpet (4)
Kasim Sulton - bass, lead vocals (1, 4, 6, 7, 9), electric piano (4), backing vocals
Willie Wilcox - drums, lead vocals (2), backing vocals

Engineered and produced by Rundgren, front cover concept by Rundgren

Charts

References

1979 albums
Todd Rundgren albums
Albums produced by Todd Rundgren
Utopia (band) albums
Bearsville Records albums
Rhino Records albums